Rise Up is an annual conference run by Catholic Christian Outreach. It is the second-largest Catholic conference for youth in Canada (behind Steubenville Toronto), and drew 1300 participants to the 2019 five-day conference in Toronto. In 2018, the conference attracted delegates from 79 of Canada’s 96 universities.

Rise Up takes place every year from December 27 to January 1. It includes presentations, workshops, live worship, adoration, reconciliation, and a New Year's banquet and dance. It is designed to deepen students' spiritual lives and to motivate them to share the faith with others.

Locations

Rise Up takes place in a different Canadian city each year.

References

Annual events in Canada
December events
Christian conferences
Youth conferences